Mustela aistoodonnivalis, the missing-toothed pygmy weasel or Sichuan weasel, is a species of weasel that inhabits mountains in the Shaanxi and Sichuan provinces of China.

Description
The external features of the missing toothed weasel are very similar to least weasels, but the tail is very long, exceeding one third of the length of body and head. The summer fur of the back, tail and head is dark brown, and there are no dark markings on face or head. Under the lip, chin and throat, the fur is white but the chest and belly are a pale yellow with some irregular and rusty-red spots. The backs of the front legs are brown, and the hind limbs are similarly brown but the inner lateral parts are white hairs with brown spots. The palms and soles have shorter hair. The second lower molar (M2) is absent unlike least weasels.

The species is named for the second lower molar (M2) being absent unlike in the least weasel.

Taxonomy
Given that it closely resembles the least weasel, after its initial description some taxonomists synonymized these two species, believing the missing-toothed pygmy weasel to be a subspecies of least weasels with a longer tail and a missing tooth. However with a more thorough morphological examination of the skins and skulls, Groves concluded it was a separate species. A recent genetic and morphometric study has since proved that the missing-toothed pygmy weasel is indeed a separate species, more closely related to stoats than it is to least weasel.

Distribution and habitat
Very few samples have ever been obtained of this species, all from the mountains of the Shaanxi and Sichuan provinces of China.

Ecology
The ecology of the missing-toothed pygmy weasel remains unstudied. The few individuals recorded have been found from 1,950–2,750 m a.s.l.

References

Weasels
Mammals of China
Animals described in 1991